Michael Whittington Creighton was ninth bishop of the Episcopal Diocese of Central Pennsylvania from 1996 till 2006.

Biography 
Creighton is the former rector of St Stephen's Church in Seattle, Washington. He was elected Coadjutor Bishop of Central Pennsylvania in 1995 and consecrated on November 18, 1995 by Presiding Bishop Edmond L. Browning in the Founder's Hall on the campus of Milton Hershey School in Hershey, Pennsylvania. He became diocesan bishop on January 1, 1996 and retired in 2006.

He is the son of Bishop William Creighton and the grandson of Bishop Frank W. Creighton.

References

External links 
Bishop Consecrated in Central Pennsylvania

Episcopal bishops of Central Pennsylvania